SS Henry St. George Tucker was a Liberty ship built in the United States during World War II. She was named after Henry St. George Tucker, a Virginia jurist, law professor, and US Congressman (1815–1819).

Construction
Henry St. George Tucker was laid down on 25 February 1942, under a Maritime Commission (MARCOM) contract, MCE hull 37, by the Bethlehem-Fairfield Shipyard, Baltimore, Maryland; she was sponsored by Miss Dorothy Baskarvill, the daughter of the managing editor of the Baltimore News-Post at the Bethlehem-Fairfield Shipyard, and was launched on 14 May 1942.

History
She was allocated to American South African Line, Inc., on 8 June 1942. On 8 June 1948, she was laid up in the National Defense Reserve Fleet, Beaumont, Texas. She was withdrawn from the fleet on 21 July 1966.

References

Bibliography

 
 
 
 

 

Liberty ships
Ships built in Baltimore
1942 ships
Beaumont Reserve Fleet